Rumunki  is a settlement in the administrative district of Gmina Susz, within Iława County, Warmian-Masurian Voivodeship, in northern Poland.
Fr
The settlement has a population of 20.

References

Rumunki